Give Me Mine is the second album by American rock band Jonas Sees in Color, released independently on April 16, 2013. Recorded on 2-inch reel-to-reel tape at Fidelitorium Recordings, the album is a departure from the band's previous material of pop rock to a more minimalist hard rock sound. The album was produced by Ted Comerford and mastered by Jamie King. Mixing and "gizmos and gadgets" are credited to Fidelitorium founder Mitch Easter, established musician and producer of artists such as R.E.M. and Ben Folds Five, among others.

Musically, Give Me Mine is similar to 2012's Soul Food with its grungy, garage rock exterior based in early contemporary music styles such as rock and roll and soul. Influenced heavily by various classic rock bands, Jonas Sees in Color blends vintage structure with a modern flare. According to music blog Planet Stereo, this attributes to creating an album that "feels fresh, [but also] has a nostalgic feel to it."

Track listing

Credits
Jonas Sees in Color
Ryan Downing – Vocals, lyrics
Jonathan Owens – Guitar, backing vocals
Mikey Deming - Bass, backing vocals
John Chester – Drums and percussion
Production
Ted Comerford - Producer
Bob Engel - Engineer
Mitch Easter - Mixing
Jamie King - Mastering
Danny Fonorow - Manager
Joey Kirkman - Cover photo
Ryan Downing - Additional art/design
Matthew Rudzinski - Additional support
Jose Norato - Additional support

References

External links
 Official website
 Jonas Sees in Color on Revebnation

2013 albums
Jonas Sees in Color albums